Balerina, balerina is a novel by Slovenian author Marko Sosič. It was first published in 1997.

See also
List of Slovenian novels

Slovenian novels
1997 novels